Dino Maiuri (sometimes credited as Arduino Maiuri) (December 8, 1916 - September 13, 1984) was an Italian screenwriter and film director and producer known for such films as Danger: Diabolik, Kiss the Girls and Make Them Die and Don't Turn the Other Cheek.

Selected filmography
 The Transporter (1950)
Fruto de tentación (1953)

References

External links

20th-century Italian screenwriters
Italian male screenwriters
Italian film directors
1916 births
1984 deaths
Italian film producers
20th-century Italian male writers